Zoë Kruger was the defending champion but lost in the first round to Tímea Babos.

Anastasia Tikhonova won the title, defeating Lina Glushko in the final, 5–7, 6–3, 6–3.

Seeds

Draw

Finals

Top half

Bottom half

References

Main Draw

Tuks International - Singles